Five Lakes may refer to:

 Five Lakes (China)
 Fuji Five Lakes, Japan
 Five Lakes, Michigan, United States
 Five Lakes is a group of lakes in Novosibirsk and Omsk Oblasts, Russia
 Fünfseenland, or Five Lakes Country, Germany
 Great Lakes, five lakes between Canada and United States